Lower Brynn is a hamlet in the parish of Withiel, Cornwall, England, UK.

References

Hamlets in Cornwall